was the son of Soga no Iname and a member of the powerful Soga clan of Japan.

Umako conducted political reforms with Prince Shōtoku during the rules of Emperor Bidatsu and Empress Suiko and established the Soga clan's stronghold in the government by having his daughters married to members of the imperial family.

In the late 6th century, Soga no Umako went to great lengths to promote Buddhism in Japan, and was instrumental in its acceptance. At that time, the Soga clan employed immigrants from China and Korea, and worked to obtain advanced technology and other knowledge. In 587, Umako defeated Mononobe no Moriya in the Battle of Shigisan, securing Soga dominance. On January 15, 593, relics of Buddha Shakyamuni were deposited inside the foundation stone under the pillar of a pagoda at Asuka-dera (Hōkō-ji at the time), a temple whose construction Umako ordered, according to the Suiko section of the Nihonshoki.

Ishibutai Kofun is believed to be the tomb of Soga no Umako.

Genealogy
Soga no Umako's wife was a daughter of Mononobe no Ogushi and a sister of Mononobe no Moriya; they had five children.

Soga no Emishi
Soga no Kuramaro
Kahakami no Iratsume, made consort of Emperor Sushun in 587, married to Yamato no Aya no Atahe in 592.
Tojiko no Iratsume, consort of Shotoku Taishi
Hode no Iratsume, consort of Emperor Jomei

References

Soga clan
626 deaths
People of Asuka-period Japan
Buddhism in the Asuka period
Year of birth uncertain